Goniodoridella savignyi is species of sea slug, specifically a dorid nudibranch, a marine gastropod mollusc in the family Goniodorididae.

This nudibranch has a wide distribution and can be found throughout the tropical and subtropical Indo-West Pacific with sightings in Australia, Papua New Guinea, Indonesia, the Yellow Sea, the Japan Sea, the Red Sea and South Africa.

Its color is white with variable amounts of bright yellow dots on top of the spicules. In some specimens, it has shown brownish pigments instead of yellow pigments.

References 

Rudman, W. B., & B. W. Darvell.  1990.  Opisthobranch molluscs of Hong Kong: part 1. Goniodorididae, Onchidorididae, Triophidae, Gymnodorididae, Chromodorididae (Nudibranchia).  Asian Marine Biology 7:31-79

External links 
 

Goniodorididae
Gastropods described in 1933
Taxa named by Alice Pruvot-Fol